Thalipeeth is a savoury multi-grain flatbread popular in Western India, particularly Maharashtra. The flour for thalipeeth, called bhajanee, is prepared from roasted grains, legumes and spices. The ingredients include grains such as rice, wheat, bajra, and jowar; legumes such as  chana, and urad; and spices, most commonly coriander and cumin seeds. When preparing the dough, other ingredients such as onion, fresh coriander, other vegetables and spices are added. Thalipeeth is usually served with butter (preferably made from water buffalo milk), ghee, or yogurt. The dish is popular in Maharashtra and north Karnataka, and it is also made with regional variations in Goa.

In a variation from bhajanee, flour made from tapioca (sabudana) and rajgira (amaranth) is used to make a thalipeeth on Hindu fasting days.

See also
List of Indian breads

References

External links
 Thalipeeth Recipe
  Sanjeev Kapoor's video for Thalipeeth

Indian breads
Maharashtrian cuisine
Pancakes
Flatbreads